Newly created taxonomic names in biological nomenclature often reflect the discoverer's interests or honour those the discoverer holds in esteem. This is a list of real organisms with scientific names chosen to reference the fictional Harry Potter series by J.K. Rowling.

Named after wizards

Named after magical creatures

Named after spells, objects, and locations

See also 
 List of unusual biological names
 List of organisms named after works of fiction
 List of organisms named after famous people

References 

Harry Potter
organisms
Taxonomic lists